Birkscairn Hill is a hill in the Manor Hills range, part of the Southern Uplands of Scotland. It is the lowest, and normally first, Donald in a round of hills known as the Dun Rig Horseshoe, south of Peebles.

References

Mountains and hills of the Southern Uplands
Mountains and hills of the Scottish Borders
Donald mountains